Mochokus niloticus is a species of upside-down catfish native to the Nile and Niger River basins.  This species grows to a length of  TL.

References

 
 

Mochokidae
Fish of Cameroon
Fish of Egypt
Fish of Ethiopia
Freshwater fish of Kenya
Freshwater fish of West Africa
Fish of Sudan
Fish described in 1835